Lophospermum purpusii is a scambling or climbing herbaceous perennial native to Mexico (the states of Oaxaca and Puebla). It has tubular flowers, white at the base and red to violet elsewhere.

References

purpusii
Endemic flora of Mexico
Flora of Oaxaca
Flora of Puebla
Plants described in 1908
Taxa named by Townshend Stith Brandegee